This is a demographic history of Quebec chronicling the evolution of the non-indigenous population in Quebec.

See also 
Demographics of Quebec
History of Quebec
Timeline of Quebec history

References
Statistics Canada website

Quebec, Demographic history of
People from Quebec
Quebec